Mize is an unincorporated community in Morgan County, Kentucky, United States. It lies along U.S. Route 460 and Kentucky Route 203, southwest of the city of West Liberty, the county seat of Morgan County. Its elevation is 817 feet (249 m). It has a post office with the ZIP code 41352.

References

Unincorporated communities in Morgan County, Kentucky
Unincorporated communities in Kentucky